Vellanjar  is a village in the Annavasalrevenue block of Pudukkottai district, Tamil Nadu, India.

Demographics 

As per the 2001 census, Vellanjar had a total population of 1674 with 838 males and 836 females. Out of the total population 926    people were literate.

References

Villages in Pudukkottai district